Nyköpings BIS is a Swedish football club located in Nyköping. The club started out as a merger in 1966 between Nyköpings SK and Nyköpings AIK. Since their foundation Nyköpings BIS has participated mainly in the middle divisions of the Swedish football league system in particular Divisions 2 and 3.

During the period 1971 until 1980 and again in 1984 Nyköpings BIS played in Division 2 which at that time was the second tier of Swedish football. The club currently plays in the third tier, Division 1. They play their home matches at the Rosvalla IP in Nyköping. Besides football Nyköpings BIS is also a track and field club.

The club is affiliated to the Södermanlands Fotbollförbund.

Season to season

* League restructuring in 2006 resulted in a new division being created at Tier 3 and subsequent divisions dropping a level.

Current squad

Footnotes

External links
 

Football clubs in Södermanland County
Sport in Nyköping
Association football clubs established in 1966
1966 establishments in Sweden